The Tektite habitat was an underwater laboratory which was the home to divers during Tektite I and II programs. The Tektite program was the first scientists-in-the-sea program sponsored nationally. The habitat capsule was placed in Great Lameshur Bay, Saint John, U.S. Virgin Islands in 1969 and again in 1970.

Habitat 

The Tektite habitat was designed and built by General Electric Company Space Division at the Valley Forge Space Technology Center in King of Prussia, Pennsylvania. The Project Engineer who was responsible for the design of the habitat was Brooks Tenney, Jr. Tenney also served as the underwater Habitat Engineer on the International Mission, the last mission on the Tektite II project. The Program Manager for the Tektite projects was Dr. Theodore Marton at General Electric.

Tektite I 
On 28 January 1969 a detachment from Amphibious Construction Battalion 2 augmented by an additional 17 Seabee divers from both the Atlantic and Pacific fleets as well as the 21st NCR began the installation of the habitat in Great Lameshur Bay in the U. S. Virgin Islands.  They had it completed on February 12. On February 15, 1969, three days later, four U.S. Department of Interior scientists (Ed Clifton, Conrad Mahnken, Richard Waller and John VanDerwalker) descended to the ocean floor to begin the ambitious diving project dubbed "Tektite I". By March 18, 1969, the four aquanauts had established a new world's record for saturated diving by a single team. On April 15, 1969, the aquanaut team returned to the surface with over 58 days of marine scientific studies. More than 19 hours of decompression time were needed to accommodate the scientists' return to the surface. The United States Office of Naval Research coordinated Tektite I.

Much of the research for Tektite I centered on humans in this new environment. Topics investigated would include: biology (blood changes, sleep patterns, oxygen toxicity), decompression and decompression sickness, microbiology and mycology.

Tektite II 

The United States Department of the Interior coordinated Tektite II, with part of the funding coming from NASA, which was interested in the psychological study of the scientific teams working in closed and restricted environments, similar to that of spacecraft on long missions. A team of Behavioral Observers from the University of Texas at Austin, led by Dr. Robert Helmreich, were tasks to record round the clock activities of the aquanauts by Cc TV.

The missions were carried out in the spring and summer of 1970 in Great Lameshur Bay, St. John Island, U.S. Virgin Islands, at a depth of 43-ft. Tektite II comprised ten missions lasting 10–20 days with four scientists and an engineer on each mission. The fifth mission, designated Mission 6-50, was the first all-female saturation dive team. The elite team of scientist-divers included Renate Schlentz True of Tulane, team leader Sylvia Earle, Ann Hurley Hartline and Alina Szmant, graduate students at Scripps Institution of Oceanography, and Margaret Ann "Peggy" Lucas Bond, a Villanova electrical engineering graduate who served as Habitat Engineer. The Tektite II missions were the first to undertake in-depth ecological studies from a saturation habitat.

Medical and human research oversight for Tektite II was well documented in a series of reports covering a project overview, saturation diving, lessons learned from Tektite I, application to Tektite II, medical responsibilities and psychological monitoring, medical supervision duties medical and biological objectives project logistics, lessons learned, excursions to deeper depths from storage pressure, decompression tables, general medical observations, psychological observations, blood changes and general program conclusions.

Tektite III 
Tektite III (Project Tektite) was a wholly owned and operated California 501 C(3) Non-Profit Corporation. Harold C. Ross was Project Manager. When Tektite II ended General Electric placed the habitat in storage in Philadelphia. A group of interested parties purchased the habitat from General Electric for $1.00 with the stipulation it would be removed from the GE storage facility. The habitat was trucked across the United States to Fort Mason in San Francisco where it was placed on display. Attempts were made to refurbish the habitat so it could be used in San Francisco Bay as a teaching tool.

By 1980 the habitat was fully restored and certified to be used underwater, but funds for actually submerging and operating the habitat again were not available. While the habitat was on display at Fort Mason, many school children were taken through the habitat free of charge by volunteers. Unfortunately lack of funds ended the project and the habitat was moved to storage along the Oakland Estuary in 1984. After several years, the habitat again deteriorated. In 1991 the habitat was dismantled by welding school students and the metal was recycled.

Ecology 
There were nine studies on the ecology of coral reef fishes carried out during the Tektite series:
 influence of herbivores on marine plants 
 bio-acoustic studies 
 observations on cleaner shrimps 
 isopods associated with reef fishes 
 behavior of reef fishes in relation to fish pots 
 bioturbation by the sand tilefish 
 escape response in a damsel fish 
 nocturnal-diurnal changeover in activity patterns, and 
 space resource-sharing

Physiology 
A goal of the Tektite program was to prove that saturation diving techniques in an underwater laboratory, breathing a nitrogen-oxygen atmosphere could be safely and efficiently accomplished at a minimal cost.

Lambertsen's "Predictive Studies Series" that started with Tektite I in 1969 and ended in 1997, researched many aspects of human physiology in extreme environments.

See also

References

Further reading
 Collette, B.B. and S.A. Earle. (Eds.). 1972. Results of the Tektite Program: Ecology of coral-reef fishes. Los Angeles Co. Nat. Hist. Mus. Sci. Bull. 14. 180 p.
 Severn, Stacey for Spaceflight Insider. 2013.  NASA's Tektite II Undersea Habitat: And Interview With Aquanaut & Engineer Peggy Lucas Bond

Underwater habitats
Human analog missions